Tortoiseshell or tortoise shell is a material produced from the shells of the larger species of tortoise and turtle, mainly the hawksbill sea turtle, which is a critically endangered species according to the IUCN Red List largely because of its exploitation for this trade. The large size, fine color, and unusual form of the hawksbill's scutes make it especially suitable. The distinctive patterning is referred to in names such as the tortoiseshell cat, several breeds of guinea pig, and the common names of several species of the butterfly genera Nymphalis and Aglais, and some other uses.

Uses
Tortoiseshell was widely used from ancient times in the North and in Asia, until the trade was banned in 2014. It was used, normally in thin slices or pieces, in the manufacture of a wide variety of items such as combs, small boxes and frames, inlays in furniture (known as Boulle work carried out by André-Charles Boulle), and other items: frames for spectacles, guitar picks and knitting needles.  Despite being expensive, tortoiseshell was attractive to manufacturers and consumers because of its beautiful mottled appearance, its durability, and its organic warmth against the skin.

The initial processing involved separating the layers of the scutes from the animal's carapace by heating, softening the plates by boiling them in salt water and flattening them under a press. Two pieces could be fused by use of a hot iron, but like the earlier stages, great care had to be taken not to lose the color. Finishing and polishing was done by various techniques mainly in Europe or in the US. Craftsmen in various Asian countries have also perfected this art.

Availability
In 1973, the trade of tortoiseshell worldwide was banned under CITES (the Convention on International Trade in Endangered Species).  The material was already often imitated in stained horn, plastic like cellulose acetate, and other materials. The synthetic Delrin has been used especially for guitar picks.

Brands of synthetic substitutes for tortoiseshell include Tortoloid and Tor-tis.

History
Tortoiseshell has been used since ancient times, and the ancient Greek chelys or lyre often used a whole shell to form its body. Inlaid veneers of tortoiseshell were popular with wealthy ancient Romans for furniture, especially couches for dining, and for small items. The Periplus of the Erythraean Sea, probably a work of the 1st century AD, distinguishes between shell from different species, with the best regarded as the hawksbill.

André Charles Boulle (1642-1732), cabinetmaker to Louis XIV of France introduced or perfected marquetry combining thin inlays of tortoiseshell backed with metal, with woods and metal, a style still called after him (Boulle work). Small luxury objects such as snuff-boxes were decorated in piqué work, inlays of precious metals and jewels into tortoiseshell (or other materials).

Hopes of capturing a large store of tortoiseshell led to the Ngatik massacre by Australian "beachcombers" of up to 50 men of Sapwuahfik in Micronesia in July 1837.

Notes

References
 Casson, Lionel, "Periplus Maris Erythraei: Notes on the Text", The Journal of Hellenic Studies, Vol. 102, (1982), pp. 204–206, JSTOR
 Caunes, Lison de, and Jacques Morabito. 1997. L’écaille [Tortoiseshell]. Dourdan: Vial. 
 "Transactions", "On Horn and Tortoiseshell", Transactions of the Society, Instituted at London, for the Encouragement of Arts, Manufactures, and Commerce, Vol. 52, PART II (1838-1876), pp. 334–349, Royal Society for the Encouragement of Arts, Manufactures and Commerce, JSTOR

Decorative arts
Materials
Turtle terminology